The 1932 Temple Owls football team was an American football team that represented Temple University as an independent during the 1932 college football season. In its eighth and final season under head coach Heinie Miller, the team compiled a 5–1–2 record.

Schedule

References

Temple
Temple Owls football seasons
Temple Owls football